Garland Augustus "Gus" Morrow (February 14, 1899 – November 4, 1987) was an American college football and college basketball player and coach.

Vanderbilt
"Gus" played both sports for Vanderbilt University, including football under Dan McGugin. He was also on the track team. Morrow played basketball at Vanderbilt under later Alabama Crimson Tide football coach Wallace Wade.

Football

1922
Morrow was a starter for the scoreless tie with Michigan at the inauguration at Dudley Field in 1922. "Thousands of cheering Vanderbilt fans inspired the surge of center Alf Sharp, guard Gus Morrow, tackle Tex Bradford, and end Lynn Bomar, who stopped Michigan cold in four attempts." As a player Morrow weighed 175 pounds.

Basketball

1922-23
The 1922-23 team went 16–8, beating the LSU Tigers but losing to the Virginia Tech Hokies in the SIAA tournament. An account of the LSU game reads: "Either Vanderbilt was in rare form or L.S.U. has a good fighting team with no shooting ability. Fans were treated to the most one-sided contest of opening day when these two clubs met, the Commodores scoring 13 points before the Louisianans had counted once, winning 36 to 10." Morrow scored 4 points.

Coaching
He was then an assistant for McGugin from 1927 to 1932. Morrow served as the head basketball coach at Vanderbilt from 1929 until 1931. He again coached the Vanderbilt basketball team from 1944 to 1946.

Cumberland
Morrow was hired at Cumberland as a coach in 1932, and was elected to the Cumberland Sports Hall of Fame in 1978.

Cincinnati
He was freshman coach for the Cincinnati Bearcats under Russ Cohen.

Head coaching record

Basketball

References

External links
 

1899 births
1987 deaths
American football guards
American men's basketball players
Forwards (basketball)
Cincinnati Bearcats football coaches
Cumberland Phoenix football coaches
Cumberland Phoenix men's basketball coaches
Vanderbilt Commodores football coaches
Vanderbilt Commodores football players
Vanderbilt Commodores men's basketball coaches
Vanderbilt Commodores men's basketball players
Sportspeople from Nashville, Tennessee
People from Mineola, Texas
Coaches of American football from Tennessee
Players of American football from Nashville, Tennessee
Basketball coaches from Tennessee
Basketball players from Nashville, Tennessee